The Lake County Public Library System (LCLS) is a library system located in Lake County, Florida.

The history of the Lake County Library System began in 1975 when the Lake County Library Planning Advisory Board was created to make a recommendation to the Board of County Commissioners for a county wide library system.

Mr. Cecil Beach, consultant, was retained to perform a feasibility study and make recommendations based on information obtained. Beach advised the advisory board to adopt the Inter-local Agreement Format for the county's library organization. The advisory board concurred with his recommendation and reported that to the board of County Commissioners.

On September 29, 1982, the Lake County Board of County Commissioners authorized the signature of the county ordinance that established the county-wide library system. Charter members of the Lake County Library system were Cooper Memorial Library in Clermont, Eustis Memorial Library and the Umatilla Public Library.

By 1997, the Mount Dora Public Library which is now the W.T. Bland Public Library as well as the Fruitland Park Library and the Lady Lake Library had joined the Lake County Library System. However the Eustis Memorial Library withdrew from the Lake County Library System.

Today the Lake County Library System is governed by the Lake County Board of County Commissioners. The cooperative still operates through inter-local agreements between the governing bodies of its 10 member libraries, and through the operation of 6 branch libraries, with an administrative office in Tavares, Florida. The current Director of Library Services is George Taylor.

The Lake County Library System mission is “To serve as the gateway to the world of information, ideas and entertainment for all county residents”.

Libraries
Astor County Library in Astor.
Cagan Crossings Community Library in Four Corners.
Cooper Memorial Library in Clermont.
East Lake County Library in Sorrento.
Eustis Memorial Library in Eustis.
Fruitland Park Library in Fruitland Park.
Helen Lehmann Memorial Library in Montverde.
Lady Lake Public Library in Lady Lake.
Leesburg Public Library in Leesburg
Marianne Beck Memorial Library in Howey in the Hills.
Marion Baysinger Memorial Library in Groveland.
Minneola Schoolhouse Library in Minneola.
Paisley County Library in Paisley.
Tavares Public Library in Tavares. Tavares Public Library
Umatilla Public Library in Umatilla.
W.T. Bland Public Library in Mt. Dora.

Services
Residents of Lake County have access to print and digital resources with an LCLS library card. These resources include print books, audiobooks and e-books, as well as music and movies. The libraries also provide patrons with access to online resources, including internet access and online reference databases. In addition to resource materials, LCLS provides outreach services to patrons of all ages.

Library cards are free to Lake County residents. Residents of Volusia, Seminole, and Marion counties can receive a free LCLS card by showing a valid library card from their county. Non-Resident memberships are also available for a fee for those not eligible for a reciprocal borrowing library card.  Students enrolled in Lake County Schools are eligible for a free LCLS card regardless of residence by showing proof of enrollment.

Lake County Library System additionally offers the following services:
 Career Online High School
 Adult Literacy Program
 Ask a Librarian
 Accelerated Reading Lists
 Books by Mail
 Technology Classes
 Friends of the Library
 Legal Resources
Voter Registration Services
 Reciprocal Borrowing
 Talking Books for Sight Impaired
 Hoopla (Leesburg Public Library)
 Kanopy (Leesburg Public Library)

Databases 

Lake County Library System also provides links to several databases for the convenience of their users. These databases include:
 ABC Mouse: For early learning for children ages 2–8
 Ancestry Library: Allows users to search ancestry history through ancestry.com
 AtoZ Databases: Provides users job search functions, reference, free E-mail services, and person/business search functions
 Employ Florida Marketplace: Designed to connect job seekers and employers in the state of Florida.
 Flipster: Digital magazine catalog
 Florida Electronic Library: Allows users to search the Lake County Library System for magazines, books, newspapers and more.
 Heritage Quest
 LinkedIn Learning: Allows users access to open online courses in business, technology, and creative
 New York Times
 Occupational Outlook Handbook
 Overdrive/Libby Catalog
 Pronunciator
 Tumblebooks Catalog
 TumbleMath
 Tutor.com: Connects students to tutors online.
 WorldCat Database: Allows users to search libraries worldwide.

Library Location and History 
Astor County Library – 54905 Alco Road, Astor, FL 32102

Cagan Crossings Community Library (Four Corners) – 16729 Cagan Oaks, Clermont, FL 34714

Opening in February 2008, the state-of-the-art library contains 30 public access computers and wireless hookups. At 19,000 square feet the library houses 47,000 materials, reference assistance, children's and adult programming, and daily courier service from other Lake County libraries. The building was designed by Harvard Jolly Architecture and cost $8,000,000.

Cooper Memorial Library (Lake-Sumter State College, South Lake Campus) – 2525 Oakley Seaver Drive, Clermont, FL 34711

The Cooper memorial library has had many homes. In 1906 the library books were kept in the home of Mrs. Payson Pierce until 1910 when they were moved to another library organization members home, Isaiah Benson. A year later the books were moved to a small Baptist church. Wanting to give the books a permanent home, club member, Mrs. Alice Cooper leased a lot on DeSoto near the current City Hall in downtown Clermont and for $600 the library construction was secured. In 2009 it made its move the Historic District and was restored  into a museum. To continue serving the community a new Cooper Memorial Library was built. Breaking ground on June 30, 2008, the new 50,000 square-foot library was built at Lake-Sumter Community College's South Lake Campus. The library is still considered a public library and is open to both the college students and the public.

East Lake County Library –  31340 S. County Road 437, Sorrento, FL 32776

Eustis Memorial Library – 120 North Center St., Eustis, FL 32726

Fruitland Park Library – 604 W. Berckman St., Fruitland Park, FL 34731

Helen Lehmann Memorial Library – 17435 Fifth St., Montverde, FL 34756

Lady Lake Public Library – 225 W. Guava St., Lady Lake, FL 32159

Leesburg Public Library – 100 E. Main St., Leesburg, FL 34748

Marianne Beck Memorial Library – 112 W. Central Ave., Howey-in-the-Hills, FL 34737

Marion Baysinger Memorial Library – 756 W. Broad St., Groveland, FL 34736

Minneola Schoolhouse Library – 100 S. Main Ave., Minneola, FL 34715

The town of Minneola was founded in 1884, originally as a part of Sumter County. After the town's conception, the children of the town had to attend school in a local church building. However, in the late 1800s, the residents of Minneola built a schoolhouse.

Originally, the schoolhouse consisted of 1-2 rooms and a belltower. In 1915, the county conducted a school merger. A larger school was built in nearby Clermont, and the Minneola Schoolhouse closed its doors. After the closure, the schoolhouse was converted into a home. The homeowners performed renovations on the old schoolhouse, but kept much of its wooden exterior and wood flooring intact.

The city of Minneola acquired the historic building for $150,000 in 2007. The schoolhouse was the first historic property purchased by the city of Minneola. After the purchase, the city began receiving donations of historic items related to the schoolhouse, such as old photographs, and an old school desk. The city bought the old schoolhouse with the intention of converting it into a library and museum. Two years after the purchase of the building, the once-schoolhouse-turned-library had its grand opening on April 18, 2009.

The Minneola Schoolhouse Library is now open Monday-Friday, 10:00 am – 5:00 pm. The library offers a variety of services to its community, such as public computers, faxing, printing, scanning, and curbside pickup. The Minneola Schoolhouse Library also hosts a variety of monthly events for its community.

Paisley County Library – 24954 County Road 42, Paisley, FL 32767

Tavares Public Library – 314 N. New Hampshire Ave., Tavares, FL 32778

Umatilla Public Library – 412 Hatfield Drive, Umatilla, FL 32784

W.T. Bland Public Library – 1995 N. Donnelly St., Mount Dora, FL 32757

Originally built in 1905 the Mount Dora Library's 150-book collection resided in a small room located in Town Hall. The library soon outgrew its humble room and in 1917 was moved to a basement located in Education Hall, a private school. The building was prone to flooding and in 1929 the library was moved to its main floor. In 1965 a library branch was established in East Town, were most of the city's African American population resided. This allowed students to attend before integration. Continuing to outgrow itself a new building was built in 1976 in what the city's Parks and Recreation building is now.  Its final home was built in 1995 with its most resent expansion being completed in 2012. The library now spans 21,000 square-feet allowing room for an archives room, a larger computer work area, community room, and a used bookstore.

References

Public libraries in Florida
Education in Lake County, Florida